Khalavarjan (also Romanized as Khalavarjān; also known as Khalah Varjān) is a village in Sheykh Neshin Rural District, Shanderman District, Masal County, Gilan Province, Iran. At the 2006 census, its population was 185, in 53 families.

References 

Populated places in Masal County